Scott Darwin Player (born December 17, 1969) is a former NFL, CFL, and UFL punter. He was signed by the Birmingham Barracudas as a street free agent in 1995. He also played college football at Florida State.

Player was also a member of the New York Giants, New York Jets, Arizona Cardinals, Cleveland Browns, New England Patriots and New York Sentinels. He was a Pro Bowl alternate with the Cardinals in 1999 and a Pro Bowl selection in 2000.

Early years
After playing college football at Florida State he became a physical education teacher at Price Middle School until 1994.  Afterwards he became a teacher at Family Worship Center Academy through 1995, during which he became the punter for the Barracudas. After his brief stint with the now defunct Barracudas he became the assistant head of fitness for the City of Birmingham, Alabama from March 1996 until October 1997. During his employment in Alabama he was signed by the Arizona Cardinals, New York Jets and New York Giants but did not make the final roster on any of these teams.  After his tenure with the City of Birmingham, he became a dispatcher at Roadway Express from January 1997 through January 1998, after which he was signed back by the Arizona Cardinals, finally making a roster and remaining with the team until the 2007 preseason.

Professional career 
He played ten years in the NFL, nine of which were with the Arizona Cardinals and a portion of a season with the Cleveland Browns.  He also played in the Canadian Football League and in NFL Europa with the Frankfurt Galaxy. Player was the last NFL player to wear a one-bar face mask, which was banned by the league in 2004. His face mask was covered under a grandfather clause.

Arizona Cardinals 
Player played for the Cardinals between 1998 and 2006, earning a Pro Bowl selection in 2000. The Cardinals released him on August 29, 2007.

Cleveland Browns 
On September 18, 2007 Player was signed by the Cleveland Browns after Dave Zastudil was injured. On October 8, 2007 the Browns released him.

New England Patriots 
On April 18, 2008 Player was signed by the New England Patriots to compete with incumbent Chris Hanson. He was released on June 12, 2008.

New York Sentinels 
Player was signed by the New York Sentinels in 2009. UFL rules allowed Player to keep his one-bar face mask during his time with the Sentinels.

References

External links
 Just Sports Stats
 New England Patriots bio

1969 births
Living people
People from St. Augustine, Florida
Players of American football from Florida
American football punters
Florida State Seminoles football players
Birmingham Barracudas players
Arizona Cardinals players
New York Giants players
Frankfurt Galaxy players
New York Jets players
Cleveland Browns players
New England Patriots players
National Conference Pro Bowl players
New York Sentinels players